Agustín Navarro (1926 – July 14, 2001) was a Spanish film director. He studied Philosophy. He directed films such as 15 bajo la lona (1959), El cerro de los locos (1960), Cuidado con las personas formales (1961), Una Jaula no tiene secretos (1962),Proceso a la conciencia (1964),  Cuatro balazos (1964),  El misterioso señor Van Eyck (1966), Camino de la verdad (1968), El día de mañana (1969) and Enseñar a un sinvergüenza (1970). He was married with the actress Carmen de la Maza and they had three children: Agustín, Regina and Pablo. He died on 14 July 2001 from a lung disease.

Filmography

References

External links
 

Spanish film directors
1926 births
2001 deaths
Deaths from lung disease